Călugăr is a commune in Fălești District, Moldova, about  to the east of Iași. It is composed of four villages: Călugăr, Frumușica, Socii Noi and Socii Vechi.

Notable people
 Dimitru Marchitan 
 Ion Dumeniuc

References

Communes of Fălești District